The Egyptian hieroglyph Emblem of the East (𓋁 Gardiner  no. R15) is a portrayal of a standard, surmounted by the "Symbol of the East". It represents  the Goddess Iabet. Her companion goddess Imentet is represented by the "Emblem of the West".
As an ideogram, it represents either iꜣbt "east" or  iꜣby  "left". The symbol for the "West"/"right" was considered 'good', and thus the East symbol sometimes symbolized the opposite of good, evil. However, as the sun rises in the East,  the solar cult often used the symbol.

See also
List of hieroglyphs/R
Iabet

References

Betrò, 1995. Hieroglyphics: The Writings of Ancient Egypt, Maria Carmela Betrò, c. 1995, 1996-(English), Abbeville Press Publishers, New York, London, Paris (hardcover)

Egyptian hieroglyphs: temple furniture and emblems